Sakteng is a town and the headquarters of an eponymous gewog in Trashigang District in far eastern Bhutan. The nearby Sakteng Wildlife Sanctuary is named after it.

In popular culture
Sakteng was featured in an Imogen Heap song and video Climb to Sakteng officially published in 2014 as part of the album Sparks. It documents the families of the village carrying power poles up the mountain as part of the successful 2012 effort to electrify their village.

References

Armington, S. (2002) Bhutan. (2nd ed.) Melbourne: Lonely Planet.

External links
Satellite map at Maplandia.com
Music video of Climb to Sakteng

Populated places in Bhutan